William McKinley "Sug" Cornelius (September 3, 1906 –October 30, 1989) was an American baseball pitcher in the Negro leagues. He played from 1929 to 1946 with several teams, playing mostly with the Chicago American Giants. He played in several East-West All-Star Games.

References

External links

 and Baseball-Reference Black Baseball stats and Seamheads

1906 births
1989 deaths
Birmingham Black Barons players
Chicago American Giants players
Kansas City Monarchs players
Baseball players from Atlanta
20th-century African-American sportspeople
Baseball pitchers